Jean Seitlinger (16 November 1924 – 1 September 2018) was a French politician who was a member of the National Assembly of France. He represented the Moselle's 5th constituency from 1958 to 1997, with interruptions. From 1979 - 1984 he was a member of the European Parliament.

The Conseil Général of Moselle renamed the Collège de Rohrbach in Rohrbach-lès-Bitche to Collège Jean Seitlinger in his honor in 2013.

He published his autobiography in 2006 titled  Un Lorrain au coeur de l'Europe.

References

External links
Official web page at the European Parliament
Official biography on the site of the Assemblée Nationale

1924 births
2018 deaths
People from Moselle (department)
Politicians from Grand Est
20th-century French lawyers
20th-century French male writers
Popular Republican Movement politicians
Centre Democracy and Progress politicians
Centre of Social Democrats politicians
Union for French Democracy politicians
The Centrists politicians
Deputies of the 3rd National Assembly of the French Fourth Republic
Deputies of the 1st National Assembly of the French Fifth Republic
Deputies of the 5th National Assembly of the French Fifth Republic
Deputies of the 6th National Assembly of the French Fifth Republic
Deputies of the 7th National Assembly of the French Fifth Republic
Deputies of the 8th National Assembly of the French Fifth Republic
Deputies of the 9th National Assembly of the French Fifth Republic
Deputies of the 10th National Assembly of the French Fifth Republic
MEPs for France 1979–1984